Foul Play or Foul play may refer to:

Foul play, unfair, unethical, or criminal behaviour 
Foul Play (novel), 1869, by Charles Reade
Foul Play (1920 film), British
Foul Play (1977 film), Spanish
Foul Play (1978 film), American
Foul Play (album), by Dennis Brown
Foul Play (TV series), 1981
Foul Play (video game), 2013
Foul (sports), act of a player violating the rules of a sport or game

See also
 Foul (disambiguation)
 Fowl Play (disambiguation)
Crime, an unlawful act punishable by some authority